Ometepec   is one of the 81 municipalities of Guerrero, in south-western Mexico. The municipal seat lies at Ometepec.  The municipality covers an area of 1,100.6 km².

As of 2005, the municipality had a total population of 55,283.

References

Municipalities of Guerrero